Chromyl fluoride is an inorganic compound with the formula . It is a violet-red colored crystalline solid that melts to an orange-red liquid.

Structure
The liquid and gaseous  have a tetrahedral geometry with C2v symmetry, much like chromyl chloride. Chromyl fluoride dimerizes via fluoride bridges (as ) in the solid state, crystallizing in the P21/c space group with Z = 4. The Cr=O bond lengths are about 157 pm, and the Cr–F bond lengths are 181.7, 186.7, and 209.4 pm. Chromium resides in a distorted octahedral position with a coordination number of 6.

History and preparation
Pure chromyl fluoride was first isolated in 1952 as reported by Alfred Engelbrecht and Aristid von Grosse. It was first observed as red vapor in the early 19th century upon heating a mixture of fluorspar, chromates, and sulfuric acid. The first moderately successful synthesis of chromyl fluoride was reported by Fredenhagen who examined the reaction of hydrogen fluoride with alkali chromates. A later attempt saw von Wartenberg prepare impure  by treating chromyl chloride with elemental fluorine. Another attempt was made by Wiechert, who treated HF with dichromate, yielding impure liquid  at −40 °C.

The approach published by Georg Brauer in the Handbook of Preparative Inorganic Chemistry drew on von Wartenberg's approach of direct fluoridation:

Other methods include treatment with chlorine fluoride, carbonyl fluoride, or some metal hexafluorides:

 (M = Mo, W)

The last method involving the fluorides of tungsten and molybdenum are reported by Green and Gard to be very simple and effective routes to large quantities of pure .

Reactions
Chromyl fluoride is a strong oxidizing agent capable of converting hydrocarbons to ketones and carboxylic acids. It can also be used as a reagent in the preparation of other chromyl compounds. Like some other fluoride compounds,  reacts with glass and quartz, so silicon-free plastics or metal containers are required for handling the compound. Its oxidizing power in inorganic systems has also been explored. Chromyl fluoride can exchange fluorine atoms with metal oxides.

Chromyl fluoride will also convert the oxides of boron and silicon to the fluorides.

Chromyl fluoride reacts with alkali and alkaline earth metal fluorides in perfluoroheptane (solvent) to produce orange-colored fluorochromates:

Chromyl fluoride also reacts with Lewis acids, drawing carboxylate ligands from organic acid anhydrides and producing an acyl fluoride byproduct:

References

Fluorides
Metal halides
Chromium(VI) compounds
Chromium–halogen compounds
Oxidizing agents
Oxyfluorides
Chromium–oxygen compounds